United States gubernatorial elections were held on Tuesday November 6, in 26 states, concurrent with the House, Senate elections and presidential election, on November 6, 1888 (except in Alabama, Arkansas, Georgia, Louisiana, Maine, Rhode Island and Vermont, which held early elections).

In New Hampshire, the newly elected Governor's term began in the June following the election for the last time. Following an 1889 amendment to the State Constitution, the Governor's term would begin in the January following the election, beginning in 1890.

Results

See also 
1888 United States elections

References

Notes

Bibliography 
 
 
 
 
 

 
November 1888 events